The Seventh Floor is a 1994 Australian thriller television film directed by Ian Barry and starring Brooke Shields.

Plot

Kate Fletcher lives in an apartment controlled by a high-tech computer system. The conveniences of the apartment soon end up making her a prisoner, as a psychotic murderer invades her building. The killer believes his long-dead sister is instructing him to kill again.

Main cast
 Brooke Shields as Kate Fletcher
 Masaya Kato as Mitsuru
 Craig Pearce as Ed
 Linda Cropper as Vivien
 Malcolm Kennard as Greg
 Russell Newman as Detective Riley

References

External links

1994 films
1994 television films
1994 thriller films
Australian television films
Films scored by Roger Mason (musician)
Films about murderers
1990s English-language films